Yves Ravaleu (25 September 1945 – 15 October 2003) was a French racing cyclist. He rode in the 1969 Tour de France.

References

1945 births
2003 deaths
French male cyclists
Place of birth missing